The automotive industry is one of the most important industries in the Czech Republic. It produces more than 20% of production volume, directly employs more than 120,000 people and at full capacity, produces more than 1.3 million passenger cars per year, which is a new car every 23 seconds (as of 2017). In total, industry accounts for 35% of the Czech economy. It also plays a very significant role in Czech exports. In January 2010, machinery and transport equipment accounted for 54.3% of exports.  In 2016, 1,351,124 motor vehicles were produced in the Czech Republic, which was 8.2% more year-on-year.

History

The Prague watchmaker and mechanic Josef Božek was the first to create a self-propelled carriage in what is now the Czech Republic. In 1815, he presented the fruit of his ten years of work - a ferry car , which is considered one of the first ferry cars in the world after the crews of the Frenchman Cugnot and the Englishman Trevithick.

Božek improved his creation for several years, after which he used the steam engine separately from the vehicle itself. Later, the Bohemian designer was engaged in steamships and rail transport, and also gained fame as a watchmaker.

In 1897, the East Moravian Nesselsdorfer Wagenbau-Fabriksgesellschaft (future Tatra) company produced its first passenger car, the President, and a year later a truck.

See also 

 List of automobile manufacturers of the Czech Republic

References 

Economy of the Czech Republic
Automotive industry in the Czech Republic